is a former sumo wrestler from Akan, Hokkaidō, Japan.  He was a member of Miyagino stable. His highest rank was sekiwake and he twice took part in playoffs for the top makuuchi division tournament championship or yūshō.  He was also a runner-up in two other tournaments. He earned eight sanshō or special prizes for his achievements in tournaments, four for Outstanding Performance and four for Fighting Spirit. He also earned three kinboshi or gold stars for defeating yokozuna. After his retirement in 1969 he was an elder of the Japan Sumo Association but left the sumo world in 1977 to become a Jehovah's Witness.

Career
He came from a family of farmers in Akan, Hokkaido. In 1953 the yokozuna Haguroyama and Yoshibayama visited the area, and he decided to join Yoshibayama's Takashima stable. He made his professional debut in March 1954. When Yoshibayama set up his own stable whilst still active, Myōbudani went with him, and this stable later evolved into Miyagino stable after Yoshibayama's retirement. He reached the jūryō division in November 1957 and was promoted to the top makuuchi division in July 1959. He initially struggled at this level, being demoted back to jūryō a couple of times and not making a kachi-koshi or majority of wins against losses in makuuchi until November 1960, when he made an effort to be more aggressive on the dohyō.

In September 1961 he was a runner-up in a top division tournament for the first time, taking part in an unusual three-way playoff for the yūshō or championship against Kashiwado and Taihō, with Taihō  emerging as the winner. After this tournament he was promoted to the sanyaku ranks for the first time at komusubi, although he was unable to maintain the rank. His fighting name or shikona had always been his own surname in combination with a variety of given names, but he changed it to Yoshibanada in January 1963 in honour of his stablemaster Yoshibayama. The change proved unsuccessful and he reverted to Myōbudani after only four tournaments. He earned his first kinboshi or win over a yokozuna as a maegashira in May 1964, and reached sekiwake in November 1964. After winning a sansho or special prize in four consecutive tournaments from July 1964 to January 1965 there was speculation that he could reach ozeki, but it was not to be. Nonetheless he was runner-up in May 1965, and took part in another playoff, against Kashiwado in September 1965. He made his last sanyaku appearance in July 1967, and was a runner-up for the fourth and final time in September 1968. His overall top division record was 414 wins against 450 losses with 6 absences, a winning percentage of 48%.

Retirement from sumo
He retired in November 1969, and became a toshiyori or elder of the Japan Sumo Association, under the name Nakamura. He worked as a coach at Miyagino stable and invited members of the Clark Hatch Fitness Center, where he had trained as an active wrestler, to take part in training sessions at Miyagino. He was also a judge of tournament bouts. He left the Sumo Association in 1977. In the same year, influenced by his wife he became a Jehovah's Witness, whose teachings forbid the practice of martial arts. He moved to Funabashi, Chiba and conducted missionary work while also employed at a building cleaning service. His biography can be found in the magazine Awake!, 8 June 1983.

Fighting style
Although Myōbudani was of relatively light weight for a sumo wrestler, he was tall and powerful, his speciality being tsuri-dashi or lift out. He used this kimarite more than any other, followed by yori-kiri (force out) and utchari (ring edge throw). His slim, muscular build meant he was popular with female fans.

Career record
The Kyushu tournament was first held in 1957, and the Nagoya tournament in 1958.

See also
List of past sumo wrestlers
Glossary of sumo terms
List of sekiwake
List of sumo tournament top division runners-up

References

1937 births
Living people
Japanese sumo wrestlers
Sumo people from Hokkaido
Sekiwake
Sumo wrestlers who use their birth name
People from Kushiro, Hokkaido